The 1922 Rock Island Independents season was their third in the league. The team matched their previous output of 4–2–1, finishing fifth in the league.

Schedule

Standings

References

Rock Island Independents seasons
Rock Island Independents
Rock Island